Hannah Montana is an American children's television series. 

Hannah Montana may also refer to:

Miley Stewart, whose alter ego is Hannah Montana

Music
Hannah Montana (soundtrack), the soundtrack to the first season of the show
Hannah Montana 2: Meet Miley Cyrus, the soundtrack to the second season of the show and Miley Cyrus's first album
Hannah Montana 2: Non-Stop Dance Party, the remix album to Hannah Montana 2
Hannah Montana 3, the soundtrack to the third season of the show
Hannah Montana & Miley Cyrus: Best of Both Worlds Concert (album), soundtrack to The Best of Both Worlds Concert film and a live album from Miley Cyrus
Hannah Montana Forever (disambiguation), season 4 of Hannah Montana and the soundtrack for the season
Hannah Montana: The Movie (soundtrack), the soundtrack album consisting of all the songs used in Hannah Montana: The Movie
"Hannah Montana" (song), a song by Migos from the mixtape Y.R.N.

Software
Hannah Montana (video game), a title for the Nintendo DS based on the series
Hannah Montana: Music Jam, the title for the third game based on the series
Hannah Montana: Spotlight World Tour, the title for the second game based on the series

Other
Hannah Montana: The Movie, a 2009 American musical film adaption of the American sitcom
List of Hannah Montana books, the book series based on the show
Best of Both Worlds Tour (Miley Cyrus), a 2007/2008 concert tour of 56 shows